Lythrypnus dalli, commonly known as the blue-banded goby or Catalina goby, is a species of goby. It is native to the eastern Pacific where it is found from Monterey Bay, California to northern Peru, including the Gulf of California. It is also known to hide amongst the spines of sea urchins. It is a bidirectional hermaphrodite and capable of rapidly switching sexes. This species can reach a length of  TL. It can also be found in the aquarium trade. The specific name honours the malacologist William Healey Dall (1845-1927), who when trawling for specimens off Catalina Harbour, California, caught one of the type specimens.

References

External links
 

Gobiinae
Fish of the Gulf of California
Western American coastal fauna
Fish described in 1890